Motivando a la Yal is the debut studio album by Puerto Rican reggaeton duo Zion & Lennox. It was released on May 4, 2004, by White Lion Records. The duo had already made waves with their hitmaking appearances on genre-defining compilation albums such as Más Flow, Desafío and The Noise: La Biografía. Motivando a la Yal was a success, aided by hits like "Doncella" and "Bandida".

Track listing

Samples
Enamórate
"She's Hot" by T.O.K.
"She's Hotter" by Pitbull feat. T.O.K.

Chart performance

Motivando a la Yal: Special Edition

Motivando a la Yal: Special Edition is a re-edition from Zion & Lennox debut album Motivando a la Yal. It was released on June 7, 2005. The album has special appearances from Pitbull and Fatman Scoop.

Track listing

Chart performance

References

Zion & Lennox albums
2004 debut albums
Albums produced by Luny Tunes
Albums produced by Noriega
Albums produced by Rafy Mercenario
Albums produced by Nely